The 1959 Coupe de France Final was a football match held at Stade Olympique Yves-du-Manoir, Colombes on May 3, 1959, and May 18, 1959, that saw Le Havre AC of Division 2 defeat FC Sochaux-Montbéliard.

Match details

First match

Replay

See also
Coupe de France 1958-59

External links
Coupe de France results at Rec.Sport.Soccer Statistics Foundation
Report on French federation site

Coupe
1959
Coupe De France Final 1959
Coupe De France Final 1959
Sport in Hauts-de-Seine
Coupe de France Final
Coupe de France Final